14th Floor Records is a British subsidiarity record label of Warner Music UK, founded in 2002 by part owner Christian Tattersfield. The label has released albums by artists including:  Biffy Clyro, Damien Rice, David Gray, Longview, Mark Joseph, Nerina Pallot, Ray LaMontagne and The Wombats.

Tattersfield was named as CEO of Warner Music UK and Chairman of Warner Bros. Records UK on 6 August 2009.

Current artists

 Biffy Clyro
 Damien Rice
 Joshua Radin
 Marmaduke Duke
 The Wombats
 Birdy
 You&Me
 beyond broken

Former artists
All the Young
Joseph Arthur
David Gray
Mark Joseph
Ray LaMontagne
Longview
Longwave
Nerina Pallot
Sneaky Sound System

References

External links
Official website

Warner Music labels
Record labels based in London